The Tondar (Persian:تندر meaning: Thunderbolt) is a hovercraft designed  and manufactured by Iran. The Islamic Republic of Iran Navy is equipped with two variants of this craft, one for combat and one for transport missions, of which the Tondar is the combat type. General Ahmad Vahidi unveiled it in a ceremony in November 2012. According to the Fars news agency, the  Tondar can be used with different types of weapons, including rockets, guns and can also launch UAVs.

See also 
Bavar 2

References 

Farsnews
Iran Unveils Home Made Missile Launching Hovercraft
Iran's Missile Equipped Hovercrafts [sic]

Military equipment of Iran
Military hovercraft
Ship classes of the Islamic Republic of Iran Navy